Marisela Treviño Orta is a third-generation Mexican-American playwright and poet from Lockhart, Texas. She attended the University of San Francisco where she received an MFA in Writing. While she was trained in poetry, Treviño Orta began writing plays after becoming the resident poet for El Teatro Jornalero!, a Latino theatre company which focuses on social justice issues.

Career 
Marisela Treviño Orta was first attracted to theatre and playwriting during her time as the resident poet at El Teatro Jornalero!. She was attracted to the theatre community, as she found poetry was often a lonely craft. Additionally, she found it was easier to explore political and social justice themes in playwriting, which she could not do in her poetry.

The playwright found immediate success with her first play Braided Sorrow, which won the 2006 Chicano/Latino Literary Prize in Drama, and the 2009 Pen Center USA Literary Award in Drama. This play was accepted into the 2005 Bay Area Playwrights Festival and officially premiered at Su Teatro in Denver, CO. Since then, she has written other successful plays including Heart Shaped Nebula (2012 O’Neill Playwrights Conference Semi-Finalist, 2013 Aurora Theatre Global Age Project Finalist), American Triage (2012 MetLife Nuestras Voces National Playwriting Runner-Up), which was a commissioned by Marin Theatre Company, and Woman on Fire, which was commissioned by the Latino Playwrights Initiative. Treviño Orta was awarded the 2013 National Latino Playwriting Award for The River Bride, and most recently was a 2018/2019 Kendeda Finalist (Alliance Theatre) for Shoe. She is a 2011 alumna of the Playwright Foundation's Resident Playwright's Initiative and a graduate of the University of Iowa’s Playwrights Workshop.

Most recently, Treviño Orta authored a trilogy of plays inspired by Latinx mythology and the Brothers Grimm fairy tales. The River Bride, the first of the three, is set in Brazil and is inspired by Amazonian folklore and premiered February 21, 2016 at the Oregon Shakespeare Festival. The second, Wolf at the Door, which is currently featured in National New Play Network's Rolling World Premieres program, is set in Mexico and focus on a Mesoamerican belief. Alcira, the trilogy's conclusion, is set in San Francisco and based on Aztec mythology.

Involvement in the theatre community 
Treviño Orta is currently a member of the Dramatists Guild, the Latinx Theatre Commons, and is a founding member of the Bay Area Latino Theatre Artists Network.

Works 
 Braided Sorrow
 Heart Shaped Nebula
 The River Bride
 American Triage
 Woman on Fire
 Wolf at the Door
 Alcira
 Ghost Limb
"Somewhere"

Awards and recognition

References 

Year of birth missing (living people)
Living people
American dramatists and playwrights
American writers of Mexican descent
Hispanic and Latino American dramatists and playwrights